This is a list of inventions and discoveries by Israeli scientists and researchers, working locally or overseas. There are over 6,000 startups currently in Israel. There are currently more than 30 technology companies valued over US$1 billion (unicorn startups) in Israel, more than all of Europe combined.

Mathematics
 Johnson–Lindenstrauss lemma, a mathematical result concerning low-distortion embeddings of points from high-dimensional into low-dimensional Euclidean space contributed by Joram Lindenstrauss.
 Development of the measurement of rigidity by Elon Lindenstrauss in ergodic theory, and their applications to number theory.
 Proof of Szemerédi's theorem solved by mathematician Hill Furstenberg.
 Expansion of axiomatic set theory and the ZF set theory by Abraham Fraenkel.
 Development of the area of automorphic forms and L-functions by Ilya Piatetski-Shapiro.Tel Aviv University obituary 
 Development of Sauer–Shelah lemma and Shelah cardinal.
 Development of the first proof of the alternating sign matrix conjecture.
 Development of Zig-zag product of graphs, a method of combining smaller graphs to produce larger ones used in the construction of expander graphs by Avi Wigderson. 
 Development of Bernstein–Sato polynomial and proof of the Kazhdan–Lusztig conjectures by Joseph Bernstein
 Generalization of the marriage theorem by obtaining the right transfinite conditions for infinite bipartite graphs. He subsequently proved the appropriate versions of the Kőnig theorem and the Menger theorem for infinite graphs by Ron Aharoni.
 Development of the Amitsur–Levitzki theorem by Shimshon Amitsur.
 False discovery rate, a statistical method for regulating Type I errors.

 Science 
 Chemistry 
 Discovery of quasicrystals by Dan Shechtman of the Technion. The discovery led him to receive the Nobel Prize in Chemistry.
 Discovery of the role of protein Ubiquitin by Avram Hershko and Aaron Ciechanover of the Technion Institute (together with the American biologist Irwin Rose). The discovery led them to receive the Nobel Prize in Chemistry.
 Ada Yonath - 2009 Nobel Prize in Chemistry for discovery of the structure and function of ribosomes, the universal cellular factory for the translation of the genetic code to proteins. 
 Development of multiscale models for complex chemical systems by Arieh Warshel and Michael Levitt of the Weizmann Institute of Science (presently at University of Southern California and Stanford University, respectively), together with the Austrian-born American chemist Martin Karplus. The discovery led them to receive the Nobel Prize in Chemistry.

 Physics 

 Prediction of Quarks by Yuval Ne'eman of Tel Aviv University (together with the American physicist Murray Gell-Mann).
 Discovery of the Aharonov–Bohm effect by Yakir Aharonov and David Bohm.
 Formulation of Black holes Entropy by Jacob Bekenstein of the Hebrew University of Jerusalem.

 Optics 
 World's smallest video camera – a camera with a  diameter, designed to fit in a tiny endoscope designed by Medigus.
 Pillcam by Given Imaging, the first Capsule Endoscopy solution to record images of the digestive tract. The capsule is the size and shape of a pill and contains a tiny camera. Created by Israeli engineer Gavriel Iddan who sold the company to Irish medical device maker Covidien for $860 million. Iddan has expressed regret for the sale due to the companies fulfillment of an ancient Jewish prophecy “The Pillcam was based on military technology... It was a good example of how we shall beat our swords into plowshares", as the Hebrew prophets predicted. Covidien was acquired by Medtronic in 2016, and is now the provider of Pillcam.
 Line free single power bicentric prismatic spectacle lens for correction of anisometropia. Sydney J. Bush  UK patent no. 1539381.

 Medicine 
 The flexible stent, also known as NIR Stent or EluNIR. Developed by Israeli company Medinol, which is headquartered in Tel Aviv.
The pressure bandage - known widely as the Israeli Bandage is a specially designed, first-aid device that is used to stop bleeding from hemorrhagic wounds caused by traumatic injuries in pre-hospital emergency situations. First used for saving lives during a NATO peacekeeping operation in Bosnia and Herzegovina, by inventor, Israeli military medic, Bernard Bar-Natan. The bandage was successfully used during operations Enduring Freedom and Iraqi Freedom and is widely used today, across the world. The bandage was nicknamed "Israeli bandage" by American soldiers, and has been "the bandage of choice for the US Army and special forces". Before the Israeli emergency bandage was invented in 1998, wounded soldiers were told to find a rock and wrap it on top of hemorrhaging wounds in order to hold direct pressure. Bar-Natan sold his company to PerSys Medical Inc in Houston, Texas, the company that first introduced the bandage to the US military.
Eshkol-Wachman Movement Notation – a notation system for recording movement on paper that has been used in many fields, including dance, physical therapy, animal behavior and early diagnosis of autism.
 Development of Azilect, a drug for Parkinson's disease, by Moussa Youdim and John Finberg from the Technion - Israel Institute of Technology, and commercialized by Teva Pharmaceutical Industries.  
 Development of the Copaxone immunomodulator drug for treating multiple sclerosis. It was developed in the Weizmann Institute of Science in Israel by Michael Sela, Ruth Arnon and Deborah Teitelbaum.
 Development of bioengineered recombinant interferon proteins by Michel Revel from the Weizmann Institute of Science in Israel.
 Development of taliglucerase alfa (Elelyso), a recombinant glucocerebrosidase enzyme produced from transgenic carrot cell cultures. Taliglucerase alfa won approval from the U.S. Food and Drug Administration in May 2012 as an orphan drug for the treatment of Type 1 Gaucher's disease.
 Development of engineered recombinant Chimeric Antigen Receptors by Professor Zelig Eshhar of the Weizmann Institute of Science and his trainee Gideon Gross, today a component of novel cell-based immunotherapy for various cancers.
Sambucol, an over-the-counter elderberry-based anti-influenza syrup. Discovered by Dr. Madeleine Mumcuoglu at the Hebrew University of Jerusalem. Studies in 1995 showed that Sambucol was effective against human, swine and avian influenza strains, although more research is required to clearly understand its effectiveness.
Development of ENvue, a feeding tube placement system with advanced methods of navigation, integrated sensors and body mapping, for accurate enteral tube placement, by the Israeli company ENvizion Medical, used in Hospitals and Medical centers in the US.

 Economics 
 Work of Daniel Kahneman and Amos Tversky of the Hebrew University of Jerusalem explaining irrational human economic choices. The work led Daniel to receive the Nobel Prize in Economics. 
 Developments in Game theory. Israel Aumann of the Hebrew University of Jerusalem received the Nobel Prize in Economics for his work in this field.
 The Rubinstein bargaining model, one of the most influential findings in game theory, refers to a class of bargaining games that feature alternating offers through an infinite time horizon. The proof is from Ariel Rubinstein 1982.

 Biotechnology 

 Nanowire – a conductive wire made of a string of tiny particles of silver, a thousand times thinner than a human hair. Developed by Uri Sivan, Erez Braun and Yoav Eichen from the Technion.
 World's smallest DNA computing machine system – "the smallest biological computing device" ever constructed, according to Guinness Book of Records, which is composed of enzymes and DNA molecules capable of performing simple mathematical calculations and which uses its input DNA molecule as its sole source of energy. Developed in 2003 in the Weizmann Institute of Science by professor Ehud Shapiro and his team.

 Theoretical computer science 
RSA public key encryption, introduced by Adi Shamir with Ron Rivest, and Leonard Adleman
The concept of nondeterministic finite automatons, introduced by Michael O. Rabin
Amir Pnueli introduced temporal logic into computing science
Lempel–Ziv–Welch algorithm, a universal lossless data compression algorithm created by Abraham Lempel and Jacob Ziv of the Technion institute, together with the American Information theorist, Terry Welch.
Differential cryptanalysis, co-invented by Adi Shamir
Shamir's Secret Sharing, invented by Adi Shamir

 Computing 

 Computer hardware 

 USB flash drive – a flash memory data storage device integrated with a USB interface.  The Israeli company M-Systems (in partnership with IBM) developed and manufactured the first USB flash drives available in North America. This claim is challenged by multiple companies in the following three countries which also independently developed USB technology: Singapore (Trek Technology), the People's Republic of China (PRC) (Netac Technology) and the Republic of China (Taiwan). See USB Flash drive § Patent controversy.
Smartphone dual lens technology, by Israeli company Corephotonics. In 2018, Corephotonics sued Apple Inc for infringement of its dual camera patents; specifically regarding several iPhone models' use of their patented telephoto lens design, optical zoom method, and a method for intelligently fusing images from the wide-angle and telephoto lenses to improve image quality, infringing on four separate patents. Corephotonics was bought by Samsung in 2018 for US$155 million.
The Intel 8088 – This microprocessor, designed at Intel's Haifa laboratory, powered the first PC that IBM built, which is credited with kickstarting the PC revolution. The 8088 was designed in Israel at Intel's Haifa laboratory. The widespread use of the IBM's PC, using the 8088 processor, established the use of x86 architecture as a de facto standard for decades. The IEEE wrote that "almost all the world’s PCs are built around CPUs that can claim the 8088 as an ancestor." Intel has credited the 8088 with launching the company into the Fortune 500.
 Quicktionary Electronic dictionary – a pen-sized scanner able to scan words or phrases and immediately translate them into other languages, or keep them in memory in order to transfer them to the PC. Developed by the company Wizcom Technologies Ltd.
 Laser Keyboard – a virtual keyboard is projected onto a wall or table top and allows to type handheld computers and cell phones. Developed simultaneously by the Israeli company Lumio and Silicon Valley startup company Canesta.Marriott, Michel (September 19, 2002). "No Keys, Just Soft Light and You". The New York Times.Shiels, Maggie (October 15, 2002). "The keyboard that isn't there". BBC News. The company subsequently licensed the technology to Celluon of Korea.
 TDMoIP (TDM over IP) − in telecommunications, the emulation of time-division multiplexing (TDM) over a packet-switched network (PSN), developed by engineers at RAD Data Communications
 Voice over Internet Protocol (VoIP) - technology for voice based communications using the internet instead of traditional telephone systems. VoIP was originally conceived by Danny Cohen, an Israeli-American scientist, but was first created, implemented, and commercialized by Netanya-based, Israeli company VocalTec and its founder Alon Cohen
Many Intel processors are developed and/or manufactured in Israel including:
Ice Lake Server processors, developed in Haifa and produced at Intel's Kiryat Gat plant.
Celeron
Sunny Cove
Rocket Lake
Alder Lake 
Pentium MMX
Centrino / Pentium M
Sandy Bridge
Development and production of processors and chipsets for many companies including Google, Apple, Microsoft, HP, Amazon, IBM, Broadcom, ARM, STMicroelectronics, Samsung, Sony, and Qualcomm, some of whom have had major research and development centers in Israel for decades, often developing key technologies in their Israeli R&D centers.
Thunderbolt a widely used interface technology, was developed as a joint venture between Apple Inc and Intel, in Israel 
Mellanox Technologies designs and/or makes crucial, industry-leading Ethernet and InfiniBand network and multicore processors, network adapters, switches (including the Spectrum family of switches), cables, software and other services for high performance computing, supercomputing, enterprise data centers, cloud, storage, AI, cyber security, telecom and financial solutions. Mellanox hardware and software is used by many large companies, such as Google, Microsoft,  Alibaba, Dell, HP, and Western Digital among many others. The Israeli company was bought by Nvidia  in 2019 for $6.9 billion.

 Computer and mobile software 
 The network firewall - technology to block malware attacks, filter malicious traffic, and prevent unauthorized access to a network. Although academic work on this had been performed by others, Gil Schwed and Nir Zuk, at Israeli company Checkpoint, released the first commercial, stateful firewall.
The first instant messaging (IM) service, ICQ. Originally developed by the Israeli company Mirabilis in 1996, ICQ was the first widely adopted IM service in the world. The company was bought by AOL for $407 million in 1998. 
FaceID, the Apple Inc facial recognition software used in iPhone devices. FaceID is based on technology created by Israeli companies PrimeSense, which was bought by Apple Inc. for $360 million on November 24, 2013, and RealFace
Windows XP and Windows NT. Much of these operating systems were developed at the Microsoft-Israel campus.https://www.researchgate.net/publication/228194988_Developing_a_Source_of_Competitive_Advantage_Israel's_Version

Page 24, Exhibit 12
Microsoft Security Essentials. Development of the Microsoft Security Essentials anti-virus suite began in December 2008 at the Microsoft R&D center in Herzliya, Israel.
Microsoft Kinect. A line of motion sensing input devices produced by Microsoft, popularly used in tandem with the Xbox gaming system. The Kinect was originally developed by PrimeSense, an Israeli company.
Babylon, a single-click computer translation, dictionary and information source utility program, developed by Amnon Ovadia.
Gett, an application that connects between customers and taxi drivers using its proprietary GPS system, enabling users to order a cab either with their smartphone or through the company's website. It was founded by Israeli entrepreneurs Shahar Waiser and Roi More.
 Mobileye, vision-based advanced driver-assistance systems (ADAS) providing warnings for collision prevention and mitigation. Many companies developing autonomous vehicles, such as BMW, rely on Mobileye's technology.   
 OrCam MyEye, is a portable, artificial vision device that allows the visually impaired to understand text and identify objects through audio feedback describing what such people are unable to see.    
 Umoove, a high-tech startup company that invented a software only solution for face and eye tracking is located in Israel.
 Viber, a proprietary cross-platform instant messaging voice-over-Internet Protocol application for smartphones.  Developed by American-Israeli entrepreneur Talmon Marco, Viber reached 200 million users in May 2013.

 Waze, a GPS-based geographical navigation application program for smartphones with GPS support and display screens, which provides turn-by-turn information and user-submitted travel times and route details, downloading location-dependent information over the mobile telephone network. Waze Ltd., which was founded in 2008 in Israel by Uri Levine, software engineer Ehud Shabtai and Amir Shinar, and is now available in over 100 countries, was acquired by Google for a reported $1.1 billion.
 WeCU (pronounced 'We See You') Technologies is a technology able to detect, identify, and analyze people in real time. WeCU is being implemented in airports around the world to help identify potential terrorists.
 Wix.com

 Robotics 
ReWalk a bionic walking assistance system  that enables paraplegics to stand upright, walk and climb stairs.
Development of robotic guidance system for spine surgery by Mazor Robotics.

 Defense 

Iron Dome – a mobile air defense system in development by Rafael Advanced Defense Systems and Israel Aircraft Industries designed to intercept short-range rockets and artillery shells. On April 7, 2011, the system successfully intercepted a Grad rocket launched from Gaza, marking the first time in history a short-range rocket was ever intercepted. The Iron Dome was later utilized more fully in the Israeli-Gaza conflict of 2012, where it displayed a very high rate of efficiency (95%–99%) in intercepting enemy projectiles. Further production of the Iron Dome system will be financed and supported by the United States government.
Trophy is an industry-leading, vehicle-mounted, active-self-protection, system designed to protect against ATGMs and RPGs. Trophy was developed by Rafael and Elta Systems. Several contracts including a $193 and $79 million contract for Trophy systems were awarded to Leonardo DRS, Rafael's American partner, in order to equip a significant number of Abrams M1A1/A2 MBTs with Trophy. In January 2021, Rafael and Leonardo DRS completed urgent deliveries of enough Trophy systems to the US Army to equip all tanks of four armored brigades, some 400 systems. Israel also supplies the German Army with Trophy systems for use on their Leopard 2 Main Battle Tanks.
IMI Tavor TAR-21 is an Israeli bullpup assault rifle.
The Uzi submachine gun was developed by Maj. Uziel Gal in the 1950s. 
Python a short-range air-to-air missile.
Desert Eagle a short range pistol.
Protector USV is an unmanned surface vehicle, developed by the Rafael Advanced Defense Systems. It is the first of its kind to be used in combat.
 Arrow 3 is an anti-ballistic missile defense system capable of shooting down ICBMs and other long range missiles.
 David's Sling is an air defense system capable of intercepting enemy planes, drones, tactical ballistic missiles, medium- to long-range rockets and cruise missiles. Along with Arrow 3 and the Iron Dome, it makes up Israel's defense "umbrella." 
 MUSIC (Multi Spectral Infrared Countermeasure) – a system that counter surface-to-air heat-seeking missiles. It is manufactured by Elbit Systems.
 MagnoShocker – combines a metal detector and a taser to immediately neutralize a dangerous person, developed by the mathematician Amit Weissman and his colleagues Adir Kahn and Zvi Jordan.
 Wall radar – a unique radar utilizing Ultra Wide Band (UWB) to allow users to see through walls. Developed by the Israeli company Camro.
  A unique evacuation method developed by Israeli company Agilite Gear, comprises a strap allowing you to carry the wounded person on your back.
 Iron Beam is an Israeli directed-energy weapon air defense system by Rafael Advanced Defense Systems.

 Agriculture and breeding 
 The cherry tomato (Tomaccio) was developed by several Israeli laboratories, the dominant ones being those led by Professor Nahum Keidar and Professor  from the Agriculture Faculty of the Hebrew University of Jerusalem, Rehovot Campus.
Watergen - an Israeli company that develops products that generate high quality drinking water from air, without needing a source of water such as a well, river, stream, ocean etc. Watergen products are being used worldwide, including in Hamas controlled Gaza Strip, Colombia, and Native American communities.  Israel recently signed a deal with the UAE to license Watergen technology. Watergen won the CES's Best Innovation Technology Award for its technology.
 Drip irrigation systems – The huge worldwide industry of modern drip irrigation all began when Israeli engineer Simcha Blass noticed a tree growing bigger than its neighbors in the Israeli desert, and found that it was fed by a leaking water pipe. Netafim, the company founded in 1965 to commercialize his idea, is recognized as the worldwide pioneer in smart drip- and micro-irrigation. It has revolutionized the agricultural industry.
 Hybrid cucumber seeds – In the 1950s, Prof. Esra Galun of the Weizmann Institute developed hybrid seed production of cucumbers and melons, disease-resistant cucumbers and cucumbers suitable for mechanical harvesting. Galun and his colleagues invented a technique for producing hybrid cucumber seeds without hand pollination.
 Grain cocoons – invented by international food technology consultant Professor Shlomo Navarro, the GrainPro Cocoons provide a simple and cheap way for African and Asian farmers to keep their grain market-fresh, as huge bags keep both water and air out, making sure the harvest is clean and protected even in extreme heat and humidity. 
 Biological pest control – invented in Kibbutz Sde Eliyahu by a company called Bio-Bee, it breeds beneficial insects and mites for biological pest control and bumblebees for natural pollination in greenhouses and open fields. The company's top seller worldwide and especially in the U.S. is a two-millimeter-long, pear-shaped orange spider that is a highly efficient enemy of the spider mite, a devastating agricultural pest.
 AKOL – a Kibbutz-based company which gives low-income farmers the ability to get top-level information from professional sources.
 Mirtra – a Tal-Ya Water Technologies agricultural technology invention. A unique, patented polypropelyne Mitra system that covers the plant's root system, directing water and fertilizer directly to the root, while protecting the earth around the root from weeds and extreme temperatures, reducing the need to water crops by up to 50 percent. It also reduces fertilizer needs by 50% and functions as an alternative to herbicide (weed-killer). 
 "Zero-liquid-discharge" system – an invention of the Israeli GFA company which allows fish to be raised virtually anywhere by eliminating the environmental problems in conventional fish farming, without being dependent on electricity or proximity to a body of water.
 TraitUP – a new technology that enables the introduction of genetic materials into seeds without modifying their DNA, immediately and efficiently improving plants before they're even sowed. It was developed by Hebrew University agricultural scientists Ilan Sela and Haim D. Rabinowitch.
 Judean date palm – oldest seed ever to be revived, restoring an extinct cultivar.

Energy
 Super iron battery – A new class of a rechargeable electric battery based on a special kind of iron. More environment friendly because the super-iron eventually rusts, it was developed by Stuart Licht. of the University of Massachusetts.
The world's first gas turbine solar thermal power station, by Israeli company AORA

 Consumer goods and appliances 

 SodaStream
Epilator (originally "Epilady") –  an feminine beauty product. It was developed and originally manufactured at Kibbutz HaGoshrim.
Wonder Pot – a pot developed for baking on the stovetop rather than in an oven.
 Micronized coating instant hot water pipes developed by A.C.T.

 Games 

 Rummikub – a tile-based game for two to four players invented by Ephraim Hertzano.
 Hidato – a logic puzzle game invented by mathematician Gyora Benedek.
 Mastermind – an Israeli board game invented by Mordecai Meirowitz.
 Guess Who? – a two-player guessing game invented by Theo & Ora Coster (a.k.a. Theora Design).

 Food and drink 
 Ptitim, also called Israeli couscous worldwide, is a wheat-based baked pasta. It was initially invented during the austerity period in Israel when rice and semolina were scarce.
 Safed cheese or Tzfat cheese is a semi-hard, salty cheese produced in Israel from sheep's milk. It was first produced by the Hameiri dairy in Safed in 1840 and is still produced there by descendants of the original cheese makers.
 Jerusalem mixed grill is a grilled meat dish considered a specialty of Jerusalem. It consists of chicken hearts, spleens and livers mixed with bits of lamb cooked on a flat grill, seasoned with onion, garlic, juniper berries, black pepper, cumin, turmeric and coriander
 Sabich is a sandwich, consisting of a pita stuffed with fried eggplant and hard-cooked eggs. Local consumption is said to have stemmed from a tradition among Iraqi Jews, who ate it on Shabbat morning.
 Shkedei marak is an Israeli food product consisting of crisp mini croutons used as a soup accompaniment. 
 Karat Caviar is a Russian Osetra caviar brand farmed in the Golan and has won several international awards.  The Russian Osetra fingerlings were imported from the Caspian Sea.
 Bamba (snack) is a peanut butter-flavored snack food manufactured by the Osem corporation in Holon, Israel.
 Bissli is an Israeli wheat snack  produced by Nestle-owned Osem. Bissli is Osem's leading snack brand after Bamba.

 Physical exercise 
 Aviva method
 Feldenkrais
 Krav Maga

 Other 

 Paranormal Activity - A famous horror film series. Produced by Israeli video game programmer and film producer, Oren Peli, shortly after moving to the US.
 Mighty Morphin Power Rangers - Brought to the US by Israeli Haim Saban.
 Homeland (TV Series) - Based on the Israeli hit TV series Hatufim.
 DogTV - The first dedicated television network designed for dogs. Created by Israeli Ron Lev and originally launched in Israel.

 See also 
 Science and technology in Israel
 Start-up Nation: The Story of Israel's Economic Miracle
 Venture capital in Israel

 References 

"Ridiculous Dietary Allowance"  S.Hickey PhD H. Roberts PhD. pp. 107–111.

 External links 
 "Made in Israel – The top 64 innovations developed in Israel" – ISRAEL21c''
 "NoCamels - Israeli Innovation News"

Israeli
Israeli
Jewish scientists
Inventions and discoveries